Nocardiopsis aegyptia  is a Gram-positive and aerobic bacterium from the genus of Nocardiopsis which has been isolated from marine sediments from the Abu Qir Bay from Alexandria in Egypt. Nocardiopsis aegyptia can degrade poly(3-hydroxybutyrate) (PHB).

References

Further reading

External links
Type strain of Nocardiopsis aegyptia at BacDive -  the Bacterial Diversity Metadatabase	

Actinomycetales
Bacteria described in 2004